William Hugh Clifford Frend  (11 January 1916 – 1 August 2005) was an English ecclesiastical historian, archaeologist, and Anglican priest.

Academic career
 Haileybury College (scholar)
 Keble College, Oxford (scholar, BA first class in modern history 1937, MA 1951, DPhil with thesis on Donatists 1940, DD 1966)
 Craven Scholarship to study in Berlin (with Hans Lietzmann) and North Africa
 Research fellowship at University of Nottingham
 Associate Director, Egypt Exploration Society, Q'asr Ibrim, Nubia 1963–64
 Bye Fellow of Gonville and Caius College, Cambridge (BD 1964)
 Fellow and university lecturer in divinity. During this time the Prince of Wales, then reading archaeology and anthropology at Trinity, was one of his students.
 Professor of Ecclesiastical History, and Dean of the Faculty of Divinity, in the University of Glasgow 1969–84 (Emeritus 1984–2005)
 Chairman, Association of University Teachers 1976–78
 Frend once stood for local government as Liberal Party candidate in Cambridge
 In the 1980s he worked at Carthage with a team from the University of Michigan
 In retirement was again elected Bye Fellow of Caius and in his last years wrote a new book about the early life of Augustine

Military career
 Assistant Principal, War Office 1940
 Seconded to Cabinet Office and served on Committees for Allied Supplies and the Free French
 Liaison officer, Psychological Warfare Branch, Tunis
 Service in Austria for 18 months
 Italy
 Commissioned officer, Queen's Royal Regiment 1947–67

Ministry
Frend inclined towards the low church tradition. He was a sometimes reluctant liberal who cautiously supported the ordination of women but criticised Bishop David Jenkins of Durham over his non-traditional ideas about Christmas. He was considered a good and humble pastor and an enlightening, if theologically unconventional, preacher.

 Reader 1956–82
 Ordained deacon in the Scottish Episcopal Church 1982
 Non stipendiary minister, Aberfoyle 1982–84
 Ordained priest in the Scottish Episcopal Church 1983
 Priest-in-charge, Barnwell with Thurning and Luddington 1984–90
 Permission to officiate in the Diocese of Ely 1990–2005
 Until his death, he continued to take two services every month

Public recognition
 Złoty Krzyż Zasługi z Mieczami (Gold Cross of Merit with Swords), Government of the Polish Republic in Exile
 Territorial Efficiency Decoration 1959
 Fellow of the Society of Antiquaries of London 1952
 Fellow of the Royal Historical Society 1954
 President of the Ecclesiastical History Society (1971-72)
 D.D. honoris causa, University of Edinburgh 1974
 Fellow of the Royal Society of Edinburgh 1979
 Fellow of the British Academy 1983
 He set up and financed the Frend Medal, awarded by the Society of Antiquaries for archaeology, history and topography of the early Christian Church. Recipients include Harold McCarter Taylor and Charles Thomas (1981), Philip Rahtz (2003), Günter P. Gehring (2000) Birthe Kjølbye-Biddle (1986), Nancy Gauthier (2002), and Samuel Turner 2004.

Family
Frend was married to Mary Grace (née Crook; 1951–2002). They had one son, Simon, and one daughter, Sally. His father was a priest of high church persuasion.

Major works
 The Donatist Church: A Movement of Protest in Roman North Africa (1952)
 Martyrdom and Persecution in the Early Church (1965)
 The Rise of the Monophysite Movement (1972)
 The Rise of Christianity (1984)

Works and publications
 The Donatist Church: A Movement of Protest in Roman North Africa, 1952
 Early Church, 1964
 Martyrdom and Persecution in the Early Church, 1965
 Saints & Sinners in the Early Church: Differing & Conflicting Traditions in the First Six Centuries, 1970
 The Rise of the Monophysite Movement, 1972
 Religion, Popular and Unpopular in the Early Christian Centuries, 1976
 Town and Country in the Early Christian Centuries, 1980
 The Rise of Christianity, 1984
 Archaeology and History in the Study of Early Christianity, 1988
 The Archaeology of Early Christianity: A History, 1996
 Orthodoxy, Paganism and Dissent in the Early Christian Centuries, 2002
 From Dogma to History: How Our Understanding of the Early Church Developed, 2003

Works co-authored with J. Stevenson
 A New Eusebius: Documents Illustrating the History of the Church to AD 337J. Stevenson (Editor of the 1957 First Edition), William H. C. Frend (Co-Revisor for the 1987 Second Edition)
 Creeds, Councils and Controversies: Documents Illustrating the History of the Church, AD 337–461J. Stevenson (Editor of the 1966 First Edition), William H. C. Frend (Co-Revisor for the 1989 Second Edition)

See also
 List of Professorships at the University of Glasgow
 Trinity College, Glasgow

References

External links
 Church Times obituary
 Telegraph obituary
 The Times obituary
 The Independent obituary

1916 births
2005 deaths
Fellows of the Royal Historical Society
Alumni of Keble College, Oxford
Fellows of Gonville and Caius College, Cambridge
People educated at Haileybury and Imperial Service College
Fellows of the Royal Society of Edinburgh
Fellows of the Society of Antiquaries of London
Fellows of the British Academy
Presidents of the Ecclesiastical History Society
Academics of the University of Glasgow
20th-century English Anglican priests
English Christians
Anglican scholars
Scottish Episcopalian priests
Historians of Christianity
20th-century English historians
British historians of religion